Civilekonom, literally "civil economist", is a professional title in Sweden (with corresponding titles in Denmark and Norway, see below) which traditionally refers to an individual who holds either a Bachelor's degree or a Master's degree in business administration and economics (with a major in business administration and a minor in economics, or vice versa). Unlike the English language usage, in Swedish, ekonomi ("economy") is commonly used as an umbrella designation for both business- and economics-related subjects.

As an academic title it was first introduced by the Stockholm School of Economics for the degree that the school offered, and was created in parallel to the already established engineering degree .

Formally, the exam certificate for a civilekonom would say ekonomexamen ("degree in economy"), or be a general Bachelor's (kandidat) or Master's (magister) degree.

Although the title remains unprotected in Sweden and the aforementioned practice is still in use, as of 2007 a new academic degree called Civilekonomexamen (Master of Science in Business and Economics) has been introduced which can be awarded after four years of studies in business administration and economics by the following universities in Sweden:

 Gothenburg University (Gothenburg)
 Linköping University (Linköping)
 Luleå University of Technology (Luleå)
 Lund University (Lund)
 Umeå University (Umeå)
 Linnaeus University (Växjö and Kalmar)
 Örebro University (Örebro)
 Jönköping University (Jönköping)
 Halmstad University (Halmstad)
 Karlstad University (Karlstad)

See also
 Civiløkonom for the corresponding Danish title
 Siviløkonom for the corresponding Norwegian title
Socionom

References

Master's degrees
Business qualifications
Swedish titles
Business occupations
Professional titles and certifications
Scandinavian titles
Economics occupations
Education in Sweden
Economy of Sweden
Economics education